Yeşilyazı is a village in the Ovacık District, Tunceli Province, Turkey. The village is populated by Kurds of the Maksudan tribe and had a population of 225 in 2021.

The hamlet of Dağgece is attached to the village.

References 

Kurdish settlements in Tunceli Province
Villages in Ovacık District